{{DISPLAYTITLE:Gamma1 Fornacis}}

Gamma1 Fornacis, which is Latinized from γ1 Fornacis, is a star in the constellation Fornax, positioned less than a degree south of the border with Eridanus. The star has a golden hue and can be a challenge to view with the naked eye even in good seeing conditions, having an apparent visual magnitude of 6.15. It is located at a distance of approximately 367 light years from the Sun based on parallax, but is drifting closer with a radial velocity of −7 km/s. The star has an absolute magnitude of +0.5.

The stellar classification of γ1 Fornacis is G9 III, which indicates this is an aging giant star that has exhausted the supply of hydrogen at its core, then cooled and expanded away from the main sequence. It is an estimated 3.4 billion years old with a metallicity that is close to solar, indicating the abundances of heavy elements are similar to those in the Sun. It has 1.65 times the mass of the Sun and has expanded to ten times the Sun's radius. The star is radiating 51 times the Sun's luminosity from its enlarged photosphere at an effective temperature of 4,657 K.

γ1 Fornacis has three visual companions listed in the Washington Double Star Catalog. These are faint 11th - 13th magnitude stars at 11' - 56' distance from γ1. Gamma2 Fornacis is a 5th magnitude star located four degrees to the south.

References

G-type giants
Fornax (constellation)
Fornacis, Gamma1
Durchmusterung objects
017713
013197
0844